The Dean of Salisbury is the head of the chapter of Salisbury Cathedral in the Church of England. The Dean assists the archdeacon of Sarum and bishop of Ramsbury in the diocese of Salisbury.

List of deans

High Medieval
 Walter
 Osbert
?–1111 Robert
bef. 1115–aft. 1122 Serlo
 Roger
–aft. 1145 Azo
1148–1155 Robert of Chichester
1155–1164 Henry de Beaumont
1166–1175 John of Oxford
1176–1193 Jordan
1194–1197 Eustace
1197–1215 Richard Poore
1215–1220 Adam
1220–1236 William de Wanda
1238–1257 Robert de Hertford
1258–1271 Robert Wickhampton
1271–1284 Walter Scammel
1285–1287 Henry Brandeston
1287–1295 Simon de Micham

Late Medieval
1297–1309 Peter of Savoy
1308–1311 William Rufati
1311–1346 Reymund de Fargis
1346–1347 Bertrand de Fargis
1347–1374 Reynold Orsini
1374–13 August 1379 (d.): Giacomo Cardinal Orsini
(cardinal-deacon of San Giorgio in Velabro; also
Archdeacon of Leicester and Archdeacon of Durham)
1380–1381 Robert Braybrooke
1382–1404 Thomas Montagu
1404–1417 John Chandler
1418–1431 Simon Sydenham
1431–1435 Thomas Brunce
1435–1441 Nicholas Bildeston
1441–1446 Adam Moleyns
1446–1449 Richard Leyot
1449–1463 Gilbert Kymer
1463–1472 James Goldwell
1473–1485 John Davison
1486–1502 Edward Cheyne

Early modern
1502–1509 Thomas Ruthall
1509–1514 William Atwater
1514–1521 John Longland
1521–1522 Cuthbert Tunstall
1523–1536 Richard Pace
1536–1563 Peter Vannes
1563–1571 William Bradbridge
1571 Thomas Cole (nominated)
1571–1572 Edmund Freke
1572–1577 John Piers
1577–1604 John Bridges
1604–1619 John Gordon
1619–1620 John Williams
1620–1630 John Bowle
1630–1635 Edmund Mason
1635–1667 Richard Baylie
1667–1675 Ralph Brideoake
1675–1691 Thomas Pierce
1691–1702 Robert Woodward
1702–1705 Edward Young
1705–1728 John Younger
1728–1757 John Clarke
1757–1780 Thomas Greene
1780–1786 Rowney Noel
1786–1808 John Ekins

Late modern
1809–1823 Charles Talbot
1823–1846 Hugh Pearson
1846–1850 Francis Lear
1850–1880 Henry Hamilton
1880–1880 J. C. Ryle
1880–1901 George Boyle
1901–1907 Allan Webb
1907–1919 William Page Roberts
1920–1927 Andrew Burn
1928–1935 John Randolph
1936–1943 Edward Henderson
1943–1952 Henry Charles Robins
1952–1960 Robert Moberly
1960–1971 Kenneth Haworth
1971–1977 Fenton Morley
1977–1986 Sydney Hall Evans
1986–1996 The Hon Hugh Dickinson
1996–2004 Derek Watson
2004–2017 June Osborne
2017–2018 Ed Probert (Acting)
9 September 2018present Nick Papadopulos

References

Fasti Ecclesiae Anglicanae 1300-1541: volume 3: Salisbury diocese

Sources
British History Online Deans of Salisbury accessed on 40 October 2007

 
Salisbury-related lists